The Bangka Island treeshrew (Tupaia discolor), also known as the Bangkan treeshrew, is a treeshrew species within the Tupaiidae. It was previously listed as a junior synonym to Tupaia glis, but was raised up to species status in 2013. It is only found on Bangka Island, which is off the coast of Sumatra.

References 

Treeshrews
Endemic fauna of Indonesia
Mammals of Indonesia